Nive is a locality in the Shire of Murweh, Queensland, Australia.

History 
The locality takes its name from the Nive River. The river in turn was named by Sir Thomas Mitchell, the New South Wales Surveyor-General, on 13 September 1846, after the Nive River in south western France, where Lord Wellington engaged in the Battle of the Nive in the Peninsula War in 1813.   Nive Downs was a huge sheep station that was broken up into home blocks and allocated to returned servicemen in a ballot after the 2nd world war.

The Duttons sold Nive Downs in 1866 and awarded a breastplate to Paddy, King of Nive Downs for the service of his tribe. Paddy was likely a Wadjalang man. The breastplate is now in the National museum of Australia.

Road infrastructure
The Landsborough Highway runs through from south to north.

Education 
There are no schools in Nive. The nearest primary school is in neighbouring Augathella. The nearest secondary school is Tambo but only offers schooling to Year 10. For Years 11 and 12, the nearest secondary schools are in Charleville and Blackall.

References 

Shire of Murweh
Localities in Queensland